Agustín Martínez (born 1975) is a Spanish noir fiction novelist and screenwriter. He was awarded the 2021 Premio Planeta for La Bestia, written alongside Antonio Mercero and Jorge Díaz under the pen name Carmen Mola.

Biography 
Born in 1975 in Lorca, Murcia, he studied Image and Sound at the Complutense University of Madrid. Initially dedicated to advertising, he began to write television series screenplays afterwards. His first novel, Monteperdido, was published in 2015. It was followed by La mala hierba (2017).

Alongside Antonio Mercero and Jorge Díaz, he was one of the three authors closeted behind the Carmen Mola pen name, known for a grim noir novel trilogy published by Penguin Random House's Alfaguara which stars "atypical" inspector Elena Blanco: La novia gitana (2018), La red púrpura (2019) and La nena (2020).

The trio wrote another novel (La bestia) as Carmen Mola, which was in turn presented as an unpublished work to the jury of the 2021 Premio Planeta under the title Ciudad de fuego and the pen name 'Sergio López'. As they won the award, the trio disclosed the identity behind 'Carmen Mola'. The circumstance of three males disguising under a female pen name and creating a fake female persona ("a female university lecturer") to market the Elena Blanco books did not avoid public scrutiny and controversy. The claimed they were "tired of lying".

Works 
Television

Novels
 
 
Pseudonymous works alongside Antonio Mercero and Jorge Díaz

References 

Spanish novelists
Spanish screenwriters
Spanish male screenwriters
Spanish male novelists
People from Lorca, Spain
Complutense University of Madrid alumni
Living people

1975 births